Grosse Caye is an island of Haiti which is located in Sud, east of Île-à-Vache which is located a bit further west, in the Baie des Cayes (Bay of the Cayes) and north of the Canal du Sud.

References

Islands of Haiti
Sud (department)